The Mary Terán de Weiss Stadium, commonly known as Parque Roca due to its location within the limits of the Parque Polideportivo Roca, is a multipurpose stadium in Buenos Aires, Argentina. It is located at Avenida Coronel Roca and Avenida Escalada in the Villa Soldati neighborhood.

The stadium, named after Argentinian tennis player Mary Terán de Weiss, has a capacity of 15,500 spectators. The first phase of construction cost 11.5 million Argentine pesos (approximately US$3.71 million). Former Buenos Aires mayor Jorge Telerman officially opened the stadium on September 19, 2006. The first official event to take place in the stadium was a semifinal of the 2006 Davis Cup, between Argentina and Australia, on September 22–24, with the Argentine team winning, 5-0.

The stadium has four main spectator areas: court-level boxes, lower and upper grandstand decks, and upper enclosed boxes. Below the grandstands are locker rooms, a large gymnasium, and offices.
In 2014 works for a permanent facade and retractable roof were started. When finished, it will be the largest-capacity indoor arena in Buenos Aires with a seating capacity being expanded to 15,500. The stadium will be able to host many events besides tennis, including basketball, volleyball, and artistic and cultural fairs.

It hosted the International Broadcast Centre during the 2018 Summer Youth Olympics.

Ciudad del Básquet

The Buenos Aires government signed an agreement with the Argentine Basketball Federation that the Argentina national basketball team will play exclusively at the Mary Terán de Weiss stadium, once it is roofed in 2007.  Also, during the first phase of construction in 2007, the Ciudad del Básquet will be built. The complex inside Parque Roca will serve as a training and practice center for the national teams, similar to the facility the national football team has in Ezeiza.

Events

 2006 South American Games
 2006 Davis Cup
 2008 Davis Cup
 2009 Davis Cup
 2011 Davis Cup
 2012 Davis Cup
 2013 Davis Cup
 2018 UFC Fight Night: Magny vs. Ponzinibbio
 2022 Futsal Finalissima

See also
 List of tennis stadiums by capacity

References

External links
 Buenos Aires government site
Ley 2502, Boletín Oficial de la Ciudad de Buenos Aires, 06-12-2007.

Sports venues in Buenos Aires
Tennis venues in Argentina
Indoor arenas in Argentina
Sports venues completed in 2006
Venues of the 2006 South American Games
Venues of the 2018 Summer Youth Olympics
Tennis at the 2018 Summer Youth Olympics